Starlet may refer to:

Entertainment 
 Starlet (film), a 2012 independent dramatic film directed by Sean Baker
 The Starlet, reality TV show
 The Starlets, a girl group

Transport 
 Toyota Starlet, a car produced between 1973 and 1999
 Corby Starlet, an airplane
 Stolp SA-500 Starlet, the American homebuilt aircraft design

Other uses 
 Starlet sea anemone, a species of sea anemone native to the east coast of the United States
 Starlets Academy, a school in Port Harcourt, Rivers State
 Starlet, the unofficial nickname of the ARM926EJ-S processor in the Hollywood graphics chip of Nintendo's Wii home video game console
 Starlette, a French geodetic satellite

Alternate spellings 
 "Starlette" (song), 1981 song by B. B. & Q. Band off the album The B. B. & Q. Band
 Starlett (band), the previous name of Ivy Lies
 "Starlett", a song from the 2004 Mother Superior album 13 Violets
 Starlett, a character from New York Nights: Success in the City
 Starlett, a character from The Carol Burnett Show

See also

 Star (disambiguation)
 Sterlet, a species of sturgeon